Spread Your Broken Wings and Try is the debut EP album by Seabird.  The EP was recorded in one of the band member’s room, and released as an independent record on May 24, 2005.  After passing their EP to EMI, the band was signed to the company later that year.

Track listing
 "Not Alone"
 "Apparitions"
 "Wings"
 "Blue Sea Opens Wide"

References

2005 debut EPs
Seabird (band) albums
Self-released EPs